Martin Bradley may refer to:

 Martin Bradley (footballer) (1886–1958), English footballer
 Martin Bradley (cricketer) (born 1964), New Zealand cricketer
 Martin Bradley (painter) (born 1931), British painter
 Martin R. Bradley (1888–1975), American politician from Michigan
 Martin Bradley (fictional character), fictional character on the Australian soap opera Home and Away